U-81 may refer to one of the following German submarines:

 , a Type U 81 submarine launched in 1916 and that served in the First World War until sunk on 1 May 1917
 During the First World War, Germany also had this submarine with a similar name:
 , a Type UB III submarine launched in 1917 and sunk on 2 December 1917
 , a Type VIIC submarine that served in the Second World War until sunk on 9 January 1944; raised on 22 April 1944 and broken up

Submarines of Germany